Alexander Ulanovsky (1891–1970) was the chief illegal "rezident" for Soviet Military Intelligence (GRU), who was rezident in the United States 1931–1932 with his wife and was imprisoned in the 1950s with his family in the Soviet gulag.

Early life

Born Izrail Khaykelevich Ulanovsky to a Jewish family in Chişinău, (Bessarabia), he joined the anarchists as a young man. In 1907, his family moved to Kerch (Crimea). Arrested for radical activity, he was deported to Siberia, where he was confined to the same village (Turukhansk) as Joseph Stalin. While in exile, he made a daring escape and "on his way out" entered Stalin's flat and took his fur coat, as was customary among fellow-exiles in such a situation.

Following the October Revolution, Ulanovsky returned to Russia and enlisted in the Red Army. He served as the deputy-commander of an armored train (under anarchist revolutionary Anatoli Zhelezniakov) and took part in fighting against White armies in Ukraine and Crimea.  After the Russian Civil War, he joined Soviet military intelligence and served as a secret agent in, among other places, Buenos Aires and Shanghai.

Espionage

Together with his wife Nadezhda, Ulanovsky came to America on the maiden voyage of the SS Bremen in 1931. His mission was to take over the GRU (military intelligence) apparatus assembled by his predecessor, Manfred Stern, who was moving on to China. Some of the known members of the group were Lydia Stahl, Robert Gordon Switz, Leon Minster, Robert Osman, Joshua Tamer, and Whittaker Chambers.

In his memoirs, Witness, Chambers provided an insider's view of the workings of the apparatus and a deferential portrait of Ulanovsky, whom he called "the only Russian who was ever to become my close friend."

The spy Hede Massing also knew Ulanovsky at this time under the alias "William Joseph Berman" ("Bill Berman"—also "Felik" and "the Long Man").  In her memoirs, she picked up on his anarchist tendencies without understanding where they came from.  Thus, she describes him as a "nice enough man," a "simple man," and "one of the least ambitious and offensive" Russian agents she ever knew, but also "confused and inept."  When Massing mentions that Ulanovsky had told her he was not her boss and that they were "both waiting for the boss", she implies that he ranked closely to her.  However, Ulanovsky meant not that "the" (their) boss but that "her" boss was coming (Valentin Markin).  Despite all this, she notes, "But one thing he did know expertly: This was conspiracy."

The group's principal activity was securing patent applications, blueprints, and technical manuals which they would pack into a large crate and ship to the Soviet Union. Ulanovsky returned to Europe after the failure of several GRU operations, notably a bungled scheme to counterfeit U.S. currency and the arrest of Robert Osman in Panama on espionage charges. An NKVD illegal, Valentin Markin, came to America and took control of GRU operations in 1934.

Personal life and death

By 1922, Ulanovsky married Esther Markova Fridgant (Party name Nadezhda Ulanovskaya).  They had a son and a daughter named Maya Ulanovskaya. In 1970, Ulanovsky died in the Soviet Union. In 1983, wife Nadezhda, daughter Maya, son-in-law Anatoly Yakobson, and grandson Alexander Yakobson emigrated to Israel.

See also

 Nadezhda Ulanovskaya
 Maya Ulanovskaya
 Alexander Yakobson
 Whittaker Chambers
 Hede Massing
 Valentin Markin
 Richard Sorge
 Ignace Reiss

References

External sources

Hede Massing, This Deception, Duell, Sloan, and Pearce, 1951.
Sam Tanenhaus, Whittaker Chambers, Random House, 1997.
Maya and Nadezhda Ulanovskaya, Istoriya Odnoi Semyi (One Family's Story), Chalidze Publications, 1982.
Louis Waldman, Labor Lawyer, E.P. Dutton, 1944.
 
Улановские Надежда и Майя: История одной семьи. С.-Петербург : Инапресс, 2005.

1891 births
1970 deaths
People from Chișinău
Moldovan Jews
People convicted of spying for the Soviet Union
GRU officers
Place of death missing
Date of birth unknown
Date of death unknown
Russian anarchists